Peroxiredoxin-2 is a protein that in humans is encoded by the PRDX2 gene.

PRDX2 encodes a member of the peroxiredoxin family of antioxidant enzymes, which reduce hydrogen peroxide and alkyl hydroperoxides. The encoded protein may play an antioxidant protective role in cells, and may contribute to the antiviral activity of CD8(+) T-cells. This protein may have a proliferative effect and play a role in cancer development or progression. The crystal structure of this protein has been resolved to 0.27 nm (= 2.7 angstroms). Transcript variants encoding distinct isoforms have been identified for this gene.

References

Further reading